Magnette is a surname. Notable people with the surname include:

Charles Magnette (1863–1937), Belgian lawyer and politician
Paul Magnette (born 1971), Belgian politician

See also
Maggette